Kennet Kjensli (born 10 March 1969) is a Norwegian athlete who competed in sprinting events. He represented his country at two World Indoor Championships, in 1993 and 1995, reaching the semifinals on the first occasion.

International competitions

Personal bests
Outdoor
100 metres – 10.26 (+0.5 m/s, Lappeenranta 1994)
Indoor
60 metres – 6.69 (Genoa 1992)

References

All-Athletics profile

1969 births
Living people
Norwegian male sprinters